Earl Norfleet Phillips (born May 5, 1940) is an American diplomat who was Ambassador of the United States to Barbados, Dominica, Grenada, St Lucia, Antigua, St. Vincent, and St. Christopher-Nevis-Anguilla from 2002 to 2003, under George W. Bush.

Biography
Earl Norfleet Phillips Jr. was born in High Point, North Carolina on May 5, 1940. He graduated from the University of North Carolina at Chapel Hill, and received an M.B.A. from Harvard Business School.

In 1972, he co-founded First Factors Corporation, a financial services business. He was also a partner in a real estate development company. From 1988 to 1998, he served on the board of Wachovia. From 1984 to 1992, he served on the North Carolina Economic Development Board. From 1990 to 1992, he served on the National Advisory Council of the Small Business Administration in Washington, D.C. From 1999 to 2000, he served as Chairman of North Carolina Citizens for Business and Industry. He was also Co-Chair of North Carolinians for Educational Opportunity 2000.

From 2002 to 2003, he served as Ambassador of the United States to Barbados, Dominica, St Lucia, Antigua, St. Vincent, and St. Christopher-Nevis-Anguilla.

Phillips was a trustee at the UNC at Chapel Hill and at the Asian Institute of Technology in Bangkok, Thailand. He has received the Global Leadership Award from Kenan-Flagler Business School. He is a member of the Council of American Ambassadors.

References

|-

|-

|-

|-

|-

1940 births
Living people
People from High Point, North Carolina
University of North Carolina at Chapel Hill alumni
Harvard Business School alumni
Ambassadors of the United States to Barbados
Ambassadors of the United States to Antigua and Barbuda
Ambassadors of the United States to Dominica
Ambassadors of the United States to Saint Lucia
Ambassadors of the United States to Saint Kitts and Nevis
Ambassadors of the United States to Saint Vincent and the Grenadines
Ambassadors of the United States to Grenada
Academic staff of the Asian Institute of Technology
Woodberry Forest School alumni
21st-century American diplomats